Richmond is the capital city of the Commonwealth of Virginia in the United States. It is the center of the Richmond Metropolitan Statistical Area and the Greater Richmond Region. Richmond was incorporated in 1742 and has been an independent city since 1871. At the 2010 census, the city's population was 204,214; in 2020, the population had grown to 226,610, making Richmond the fourth-most populous city in Virginia. The Richmond Metropolitan Area has a population of 1,260,029, the third-most populous metro in the state.

Major suburbs include Midlothian to the southwest, Chesterfield to the south, Varina to the southeast, Sandston to the east, Glen Allen to the north and west, Short Pump to the west and Mechanicsville to the northeast.

The site of Richmond had been an important village of the Powhatan Confederacy, and was briefly settled by English colonists from Jamestown from 1609 to 1611. The present city of Richmond was founded in 1737. It became the capital of the Colony and Dominion of Virginia in 1780, replacing Williamsburg. During the Revolutionary War period, several notable events occurred in the city, including Patrick Henry's "Give me liberty, or give me death!" speech in 1775 at St. John's Church, and the passage of the Virginia Statute for Religious Freedom written by Thomas Jefferson. During the American Civil War, Richmond was the capital of the Confederacy. It entered the 20th century with one of the world's first successful electric streetcar systems. The Jackson Ward neighborhood is a traditional hub of African-American commerce and culture.

Richmond's economy is primarily driven by law, finance, and government, with federal, state, and local governmental agencies, as well as notable legal and banking firms in the downtown area. The city is home to both a U.S. Court of Appeals, one of 13 such courts, and a Federal Reserve Bank, one of 12 such banks. There are several Fortune 500 companies headquartered in the city including: Dominion Energy, WestRock, Performance Food Group, CarMax, ARKO, and Altria with others, such as Markel, in the metropolitan area.

History

Colonial era

After the first permanent English-speaking settlement was established in April 1607, at Jamestown, Virginia, Captain Christopher Newport led explorers northwest up the James River to an inhabited area within the Powhatan Nation.

The earliest European settlement in Central Virginia was in 1611 at Henricus, where the Falling Creek empties into the James River. In 1619 early Virginia Company settlers struggling to establish viable moneymaking industries established the Falling Creek Ironworks. After decades of conflicts between the Powhatan and the settlers, the Falls of the James saw more White settlement in the late 1600s and early 1700s.

The Battle of Bloody Run was fought near Richmond in 1656, after an influx of Manahoacs and Nahyssans from the North.

In 1737 planter William Byrd II commissioned Major William Mayo to lay out the original town grid. Byrd named the city after the English town of Richmond near (and now part of) London, because the view of the bend in the James River at the fall line was similar to the view of the River Thames from Richmond Hill in England (which was in turn named after Henry VII's ancestral town of Richmond, North Yorkshire), where he had spent time during his youth. The settlement was laid out in April 1737 and incorporated as a town in 1742.

Revolution
In 1775 Patrick Henry delivered his famous "Give me liberty, or give me death" speech in St. John's Church in Richmond, crucial for deciding Virginia's participation in the First Continental Congress and setting the course for revolution and independence. On April 18, 1780, the state capital was moved from the colonial capital of Williamsburg to Richmond, to provide a more centralized location for Virginia's increasing westerly population, as well as to isolate the capital from British attack. The latter motive proved to be in vain, and in 1781, under the command of Benedict Arnold, Richmond was burned by British troops, causing Governor Thomas Jefferson to flee as the Virginia militia, led by Sampson Mathews, defended the city.

Early United States

Richmond recovered quickly from the war, and by 1782 was once again a thriving city. In 1786 the Virginia Statute for Religious Freedom (drafted by Thomas Jefferson, 1743–1826) was passed at the temporary capitol in Richmond, providing the basis for the separation of church and state, a key element in the development of freedom of religion in the United States. A permanent home for the new government, the Greek Revival style of the Virginia State Capitol building, was designed by Jefferson with the assistance of Charles-Louis Clérisseau and completed in 1788.

After the American Revolutionary War (1775–1783), Richmond emerged as an important industrial center. To facilitate the transfer of cargo from the flat-bottomed James River bateaux above the fall line to the ocean-faring ships below, George Washington helped design the James River and Kanawha Canal from Westham east to Richmond, to bypass Richmond's rapids on the upper James River with the intent of providing a water route across the Appalachian Mountains to the Kanawha River flowing westward into the Ohio then eventually to the Mississippi River. The legacy of the canal boatmen is represented by the figure in the center of the city flag. As a result of this and ample access to hydropower due to the falls, Richmond became home to some of the country's largest manufacturing facilities, including iron works and flour mills, the largest of their kind in the South. The resistance to the slave trade was growing by the mid-19th century; in one famous 1849 case, Henry "Box" Brown made history by having himself nailed into a small box and shipped from Richmond through Baltimore's President Street Station northward on the Philadelphia, Wilmington and Baltimore Railroad (a well-used "Underground Railroad" route for escaping disguised slaves) to abolitionists in Philadelphia, in the free state of Pennsylvania, escaping slavery. By 1850 Richmond was connected by the Richmond and Petersburg Railroad to Port Walthall, where ships carrying over 200 tons of cargo could connect to Baltimore or Philadelphia and passenger liners could reach Norfolk, Virginia, through the Hampton Roads harbor. In the 19th century Richmond was connected to the North by the Richmond, Fredericksburg and Potomac Railroad, which was later replaced by CSXT.

American Civil War

On April 17, 1861, five days after the Confederate attack on Fort Sumter, the state legislature voted to secede from the United States and join the newly created Confederate States of America. Official action came in May, after the Confederacy promised to move its national capital to Richmond from its temporary home in Montgomery, Alabama. However, the new capital was at the end of a long supply line, which made it difficult to defend. For four years its defense required the bulk of the Army of Northern Virginia and the Confederacy's best troops and commanders. It became the main target of Union armies, especially in the campaigns of 1862 and 1864–65.

Richmond held local, state and national government offices. hospitals, a railroad hub, and one of the largest slave markets. It also had the largest arms factory during the war, the Tredegar Iron Works. It produced artillery and other munitions, including the 723 tons of armor plating that covered the CSS Virginia the world's first ironclad warship used in war, as well as much of the Confederates' heavy ordnance machinery. The Confederate States Congress shared quarters with the Virginia General Assembly in Jefferson's designed Virginia State Capitol, with the Confederacy's executive mansion, known as the "White House of the Confederacy", two blocks away on Clay Street. The Seven Days Battles followed in late June and early July 1862, during which commanding Union General-in-Chief George B. McClellan threatened to take Richmond in the Peninsula campaign but failed.

Three years later, in March 1865, Richmond became indefensible after nearby Petersburg and several remaining rail supply lines to the south and southwest were broken. On March 25 Confederate General John B. Gordon's desperate attack on Fort Stedman east of Petersburg failed. On April 1 Federal Cavalry General Philip Sheridan, assigned to interdict the Southside Railroad, met brigades commanded by Southern General George Pickett at the Five Forks junction, smashing them, taking thousands of prisoners, and encouraging Union General-in-Chief Ulysses S. Grant to order a general advance. When the Union Sixth Corps broke through Confederate lines on the Boydton Plank Road south of Petersburg, Confederate casualties exceeded 5,000, about a tenth of Lee's defending army. Lee then informed President Jefferson Davis that he was about to evacuate Richmond.

The Confederate Army began the evacuation of Richmond on April 2, 1865. Davis and his cabinet, along with the government archives and Treasury gold, left the city by train that night, as government officials burned documents and departing Confederate troops burned tobacco and other warehouses to deny their contents to the victors. In the early a.m. of the following day, Confederate troops exploded the gunpowder magazine, resulting in the death of several paupers residing in the temporary Almshouse. It was on April 3, 1865, General Godfrey Weitzel, commander of the 25th Corps of the United States Colored Troops, accepted the city's surrender from the mayor and a group of leading citizens who remained. The Union troops eventually stopped the raging fires but about 25% of the city's buildings were destroyed.

President Abraham Lincoln visited Grant at Petersburg on April 3, and took a launch to Richmond up the James River the next day, while Davis attempted to organize his remaining Confederate government further southwest at Danville. Lincoln met Confederate assistant secretary of War John A. Campbell, and handed him a note inviting Virginia's state legislature to end their rebellion. After Campbell spun the note to Confederate legislators as a possible end to the Emancipation Proclamation, Lincoln rescinded his offer and ordered Weitzel to prevent the former Confederate state legislature from meeting. Union forces killed, wounded or captured 8,000 Confederate troops at Sayler's Creek southwest of Petersburg on April 6, as the Southerners continued a general retreat southwestward. Lee continued to reject Grant's surrender suggestions until Sheridan's infantry and cavalry moved around the shrinking Army of Northern Virginia and appeared in front of his withdrawing forces on April 8, cutting off the line of further retreat southwest. He surrendered his remaining approximately 10,000 troops at Appomattox Court House, meeting Grant the following morning at the McLean Home. Davis was captured on May 10 near Irwinville, Georgia, and taken back to Virginia, where he was imprisoned for two years at Fort Monroe until freed on bail.

Postbellum
Richmond emerged a decade after the smoldering rubble of the Civil War to resume its position as an economic powerhouse, with iron front buildings and massive brick factories. Canal traffic peaked in the 1860s and slowly gave way to railroads, allowing Richmond to become a major railroad crossroads, eventually including the site of the world's first triple railroad crossing. Tobacco warehousing and processing continued to play a role, boosted by the world's first cigarette-rolling machine, invented by James Albert Bonsack of Roanoke in 1880/81. Contributing to Richmond's resurgence was the country's first successful electrically powered trolley system, the Richmond Union Passenger Railway. Designed by electric power pioneer Frank J. Sprague, the system opened its first line in 1888, and electric streetcar lines rapidly spread to other cities. Sprague's system used an overhead wire and trolley pole to collect current, with electric motors on the car's trucks. Transition from streetcars to buses began in May 1947 and was completed on November 25, 1949.

20th century

In 1900 the Census Bureau reported Richmond's population as 62.1% white and 37.9% black. Freed slaves and their descendants created a thriving African-American business community, and the city's historic Jackson Ward became known as the "Wall Street of Black America". In 1903 African-American businesswoman and financier Maggie L. Walker chartered St. Luke Penny Savings Bank and served as its first president. Charles Thaddeus Russell was Richmond's first black architect and he designed the building for Walker. Walker was the first female bank president in the United States. Today the bank is called the Consolidated Bank and Trust Company and is the country's oldest surviving African-American bank. Other figures from this time included John Mitchell Jr. In 1910 the former city of Manchester consolidated with Richmond, and in 1914 the city annexed Barton Heights, Ginter Park, and Highland Park in Henrico County. In May 1914 Richmond became the headquarters of the Fifth District of the Federal Reserve Bank.

Several major performing arts venues were constructed during the 1920s, including what are now the Landmark Theatre, Byrd Theatre, and Carpenter Theatre. The city's first radio station, WRVA, began broadcasting in 1925. WTVR-TV (CBS 6), Richmond's first television station, was the first TV station south of Washington, D.C.

Between 1963 and 1965 there was a "downtown boom" that led to the construction of more than 700 buildings. In 1968 Virginia Commonwealth University was created by the merger of the Medical College of Virginia with the Richmond Professional Institute. In 1970 Richmond's borders expanded by an additional  on the southside. After several years of court cases in which Chesterfield County fought annexation, more than 47,000 former Chesterfield County residents found themselves within the city's perimeters on January 1, 1970. In 1996 still-sore tensions arose amid controversy involved in adding a statue of African American Richmond native and tennis star Arthur Ashe to the series of statues of Confederate generals on Monument Avenue. After several months of controversy Ashe's bronze statue was finally completed, facing the opposite direction from the Confederate generals, on July 10, 1996.

A multimillion-dollar flood wall was completed in 1995 to protect low-lying areas of city from the oft-rising James River. As a result, the River District businesses grew rapidly, and today the area is home to much of Richmond's entertainment, dining and nightlife activity, bolstered by the creation of a Canal Walk along the city's former industrial canals.

Geography

Richmond is located at  (37.538, −77.462). The city is in the Piedmont region of Virginia, at the James River's highest navigable point. The Piedmont region is characterized by relatively low, rolling hills, and lies between the low, flat Tidewater region and the Blue Ridge Mountains. Significant bodies of water in the region include the James River, the Appomattox River, and the Chickahominy River.

The Richmond-Petersburg Metropolitan Statistical Area (MSA), the 44th largest in the United States, includes the independent cities of Richmond, Colonial Heights, Hopewell, and Petersburg, as well as the counties of Charles City, Chesterfield, Dinwiddie, Goochland, Hanover, Henrico, New Kent, Powhatan, and Prince George. On July 1, 2009, the Richmond—Petersburg MSA's population was 1,258,251.

Richmond is located 21.69 miles north of Petersburg, Virginia, 66.10 miles southeast of Charlottesville, Virginia, 79.24 miles northwest of Norfolk, Virginia, 96.87 miles south of Washington, D.C., and 138.72 miles northeast of Raleigh, North Carolina.

Cityscape

Richmond's original street grid, laid out in 1737, included the area between what are now Broad, 17th, and 25th Streets and the James River. Modern Downtown Richmond is slightly farther west, on the slopes of Shockoe Hill. Nearby neighborhoods include Shockoe Bottom, the historically significant and low-lying area between Shockoe Hill and Church Hill, and Monroe Ward, which contains the Jefferson Hotel. Richmond's East End includes neighborhoods like rapidly gentrifying Church Hill, home to St. John's Church, as well as poorer areas like Fulton, Union Hill, and Fairmont, and public housing projects like Mosby Court, Whitcomb Court, Fairfield Court, and Creighton Court closer to Interstate 64.

The area between Belvidere Street, Interstate 195, Interstate 95, and the river, which includes Virginia Commonwealth University, is socioeconomically and architecturally diverse. North of Broad Street, the Carver and Newtowne West neighborhoods are demographically similar to neighboring Jackson Ward, with Carver experiencing some gentrification due to its proximity to VCU. The affluent area between the Boulevard, Main Street, Broad Street, and VCU, known as the Fan, is home to Monument Avenue, an outstanding collection of Victorian architecture, and many students. West of the Boulevard is the Museum District, which contains the Virginia Historical Society and the Virginia Museum of Fine Arts. South of the Downtown Expressway are Byrd Park, Maymont, Hollywood Cemetery, the predominantly black working-class Randolph neighborhood, and white working-class Oregon Hill. Cary Street between Interstate 195 and the Boulevard is a popular commercial area called Carytown.

Richmond's Northside is home to numerous listed historic districts. Neighborhoods such as Chestnut Hill-Plateau and Barton Heights began to develop at the end of the 19th century when the new streetcar system made it possible for people to live on the outskirts of town and still commute to jobs downtown. Other prominent Northside neighborhoods include Azalea, Barton Heights, Bellevue, Chamberlayne, Ginter Park, Highland Park, and Rosedale.

Farther west is the affluent, suburban West End. Windsor Farms is among its best-known sections. The West End also includes middle- to low-income neighborhoods such as Laurel, Farmington and the areas surrounding the Regency Mall. More affluent areas include Glen Allen, Short Pump, and the areas of Tuckahoe away from Regency Mall, all north and northwest of the city. The University of Richmond and the Country Club of Virginia are located on this side of town near the Richmond-Henrico border.

The portion of the city south of the James River is known as the Southside. Southside neighborhoods range from the affluent and middle-class suburban Westover Hills, Forest Hill, Southampton, Stratford Hills, Oxford, Huguenot Hills, Hobby Hill, and Woodland Heights to the impoverished Manchester and Blackwell areas, the Hillside Court housing projects, and the ailing Jefferson Davis Highway commercial corridor. Other Southside neighborhoods include Fawnbrook, Broad Rock, Cherry Gardens, Cullenwood, and Beaufont Hills. Much of Southside developed a suburban character as part of Chesterfield County before being annexed by Richmond, most notably in 1970.

Climate

According to the Köppen climate classification, Richmond has a humid subtropical climate (Köppen: Cfa), with hot, humid summers and moderately cold winters. The Trewartha classification defines Richmond as Temperate Oceanic Climate due to winter chill. The mountains to the west act as a partial barrier to outbreaks of cold, continental air in winter; Arctic air is delayed long enough to be modified, then further warmed as it subsides in its approach to Richmond. The open waters of the Chesapeake Bay and Atlantic Ocean contribute to the humid summers and cool winters. Richmond's Downtown and areas south and east of downtown are in USDA Hardiness zones 7b. Surrounding suburbs and areas to the north and west of Downtown are in Hardiness Zone 7a. Temperatures seldom fall below , with the most recent subzero reading on January 7, 2018, when the temperature reached .

Precipitation is rather uniformly distributed throughout the year. Dry periods lasting several weeks sometimes occur, especially in autumn, when long periods of pleasant, mild weather are most common. There is considerable variability in total monthly amounts from year to year so that no one month can be depended upon to be normal. Snow has been recorded during seven of the 12 months. Snow typically remains on the ground for only one or two days, but remained for 16 days in 2010 (January 30 to February 14). Ice storms (freezing rain or glaze) are not uncommon, but are seldom severe enough to do considerable damage.

The James River reaches tidewater at Richmond, where flooding may occur in any month of the year, most frequently in March and least in July. Hurricanes and tropical storms have been responsible for most of the flooding during the summer and early fall months. Hurricanes passing near Richmond have produced record rainfalls. In 1955, three hurricanes brought record rainfall to Richmond within a six-week period. The most noteworthy were Hurricane Connie and Hurricane Diane, which brought heavy rains five days apart.

Damaging storms occur mainly from snow and freezing rain in winter, and from hurricanes, tornadoes, and severe thunderstorms in other seasons. Damage may be from wind, flooding, rain, or any combination of these. Tornadoes are infrequent but some notable ones have been observed in the Richmond area.

Downtown Richmond averages 84 days of nighttime frost annually. Nighttime frost is more common in areas north and west of Downtown and less common south and east of downtown. From 1981 to 2010 the average first temperature at or below freezing was on October 30 and the average last one on April 10.

Demographics

The population of Richmond City, currently 226,000, may be misleading as Richmond is a continuous metropolitan area in the Greater Richmond region that has an estimated population of about 1.3 million. Richmond City is surrounded by Henrico County which has a population of about 334,000.

2020 census

Note: the US Census treats Hispanic/Latino as an ethnic category. This table excludes Latinos from the racial categories and assigns them to a separate category. Hispanics/Latinos can be of any race.

2010 Census
As of the 2010 United States Census, there were 204,214 people living in the city. 50.6% were Black or African American, 40.8% White, 2.3% Asian, 0.3% Native American, 0.1% Pacific Islander, 3.6% of some other race and 2.3% of two or more races. 6.3% were Hispanic or Latino (of any race).

As of the census of 2000, there were 197,790 people, 84,549 households, and 43,627 families living in the city. The racial makeup of the city was 57.2% African American, 38.3% White, 0.2% Native American, 1.3% Asian, 0.1% Pacific Islander, 1.5% from other races, and 1.5% from two or more races. Hispanic or Latino of any race were 2.6% of the population.

There were 84,549 households, out of which 23.1% had children under the age of 18 living with them, 27.1% were married couples living together, 20.4% had a female householder with no husband present, and 48.4% were non-families. 37.6% of all households were made up of individuals, and 10.9% had someone living alone who was 65 years of age or older. The average household size was 2.21 and the average family size was 2.95.

In the city, the age distribution of the population shows 21.8% under the age of 18, 13.1% from 18 to 24, 31.7% from 25 to 44, 20.1% from 45 to 64, and 13.2% who were 65 years of age or older. The median age was 34 years. For every 100 females, there were 87.1 males. For every 100 females age 18 and over, there were 83.5 males.

The median income for a household in the city was $31,121, and the median income for a family was $38,348. Males had a median income of $30,874 versus $25,880 for females. The per capita income for the city was $20,337. About 17.1% of families and 21.4% of the population were below the poverty line, including 32.9% of those under age 18 and 15.8% of those age 65 or over.

Crime
Richmond experienced a spike in overall crime, in particular the city's murder rate, during the 1980s, 1990s, and the early 2000s. It was consistently ranked as one of the most dangerous cities in the United States during that time.

From the late 2000s to present, various forms of crime have significantly decreased in the city. Its major crime rate, including violent and property crimes, decreased 47 percent between 2004 and 2009 to its lowest level in more than a quarter of a century. In 2008, Richmond had fallen to 49th on a Morgan Quitno Press ranking of the most dangerous cities in the United States and the city had recorded the lowest homicide rate since 1971. By 2012, Richmond was no longer in the 'top' 200.

In recent years, as in many other American cities, Richmond has witnessed a slight rise in homicides though violent crime and other forms of crime remain below the national average.

Religion
In 1786, the Virginia Statute for Religious Freedom, penned in 1779 by Thomas Jefferson, was adopted by the Virginia General Assembly in Richmond. The site is now commemorated by the First Freedom Center.

Richmond has several historic churches. Because of its early English colonial history from the early 17th century to 1776, Richmond has a number of prominent Anglican/Episcopal churches including Monumental Church, St. Paul's Episcopal Church and St. John's Episcopal Church. Methodists and Baptists made up another section of early churches, and First Baptist Church of Richmond was the first of these, established in 1780. In the Reformed church tradition, the first Presbyterian Church in the City of Richmond was First Presbyterian Church, organized on June 18, 1812. On February 5, 1845, Second Presbyterian Church of Richmond was founded, which was a historic church where Stonewall Jackson attended and was the first Gothic building and the first gas-lit church to be built in Richmond. St. Peter's Church was dedicated and became the first Catholic church in Richmond on May 25, 1834. The city is also home to the historic Cathedral of the Sacred Heart which is the mother church for the Roman Catholic Diocese of Richmond.

The first Jewish congregation in Richmond was Kahal Kadosh Beth Shalom. Kahal Kadosh Beth Shalom was the sixth congregation in the United States. By 1822 K.K. Beth Shalom members worshipped in the first synagogue building in Virginia. They eventually merged with Congregation Beth Ahabah, an offshoot of Beth Shalom. There are two Orthodox Synagogues, Keneseth Beth Israel and Chabad of Virginia. There is an Orthodox Yeshivah K–12 school system known as Rudlin Torah academy, which also includes a post high-school program. There are two Conservative synagogues, Beth El and Or Atid. There are two Reform synagogues, Beth Ahabah and Or Ami. Along with such religious congregations, there are a variety of other Jewish charitable, educational and social service institutions, each serving the Jewish and general communities. These include the Weinstein Jewish Community Center, Jewish Family Services, Jewish Community Federation of Richmond and Richmond Jewish Foundation.

Due to the influx of German immigrants in the 1840s, St. John's German Evangelical church was formed in 1843. Saints Constantine and Helen Greek Orthodox Cathedral held its first worship service in a rented room at 309 North 7th Street in 1917. The cathedral relocated to 30 Malvern Avenue in 1960 and is noted as one of two Eastern Orthodox churches in Richmond and home to the annual Richmond Greek Festival.

There are seven current masjids in the Greater Richmond area, with three more currently in construction, accommodating the growing Muslim population, the first one being Masjid Bilal. In the 1950s, Muslims from the East End got organized under Nation of Islam (NOI). They used to meet in Temple #24 located on North Avenue. After the NOI split in 1975, the Muslims who joined mainstream Islam, start meeting at Shabaaz Restaurant on Nine Mile Road. By 1976, the Muslims used to meet in a rented church. They tried to buy this church, but due to financial difficulties the Muslims instead bought an old grocery store at Chimbarazoo Boulevard, the present location of Masjid Bilal. Initially, the place was called "Masjid Muhammad #24". Only by 1990 did the Muslims renamed it to "Masjid Bilal". Masjid Bilal was followed by the Islamic Center of Virginia, ICVA masjid. The ICVA was established in 1973 as a non profit tax exempt organization. With aggressive fundraising, ICVA was able to buy land on Buford road. Construction of the new masjid began in the early 1980s. The rest of the five current masjids in the Richmond area are Islamic Center of Richmond (ICR) in the west end, Masjid Umm Barakah on 2nd street downtown, Islamic Society of Greater Richmond (ISGR) in the west end, Masjidullah in the north side, and Masjid Ar-Rahman in the east end.

Hinduism is actively practiced, particularly in suburban areas of Henrico and Chesterfield. Some 6,000 families of Indian descent resided in the Richmond Region as of 2011. Hindus are served by several temples and cultural centers. The two most familiar are the Cultural Center of India (CCI) located off of Iron Bridge Road in Chesterfield County and the Hindu Center of Virginia in Henrico County which has garnered national fame and awards for being the first LEED certified religious facility in the commonwealth.

Seminaries in Richmond include: the school of theology at Virginia Union University; a Presbyterian seminary, Union Presbyterian Seminary, and the Baptist Theological Seminary at Richmond. The McCollough Theological Seminary of the United House of Prayer For All People is located in the Church Hill neighborhood of the city.

Bishops that sit in Richmond include those of the Episcopal Diocese of Virginia (the denomination's largest); the Richmond Area of the United Methodist Church (Virginia Annual Conference), the nation's second-largest and one of the oldest. The Presbytery of the James—Presbyterian Church (USA) – also is based in the Richmond area.

The Roman Catholic Diocese of Richmond was canonically erected by Pope Pius VII on July 11, 1820. Today there are 235,816 Catholics at 146 parishes in the Diocese of Richmond. The city of Richmond is home to 19 Catholic parishes. Cathedral of the Sacred Heart is home to the current bishop, Most Reverend Barry C. Knestout, who was appointed by Pope Francis on December 15, 2017.

The Church of Jesus Christ of Latter-day Saints has three stakes in the greater Richmond area (a stake is an organizational unit that is made up of multiple congregations. As of December 31, 2017, The Church of Jesus Christ of Latter-day Saints reported 95,379 members in 200 congregations within 22 stakes across the state of Virginia).  In April 2018, church president Russell M. Nelson announced a new temple to be built in Virginia. The first temple of the church to be built in the state, the temple is located in Glen Allen, Virginia, a northwest suburb of Richmond.

Economy

Richmond's strategic location on the James River, built on undulating hills at the rocky fall line separating the Piedmont and Tidewater regions of Virginia, provided a natural nexus for the development of commerce. Throughout these three centuries and three modes of transportation, the downtown has always been a hub, with the Great Turning Basin for boats, the world's only triple crossing of rail lines, and the intersection of two major interstates.

Law and finance have long been driving forces in the economy. Richmond is particularly known for its bankruptcy court. The city is home to both the United States Court of Appeals for the Fourth Circuit, one of 13 United States courts of appeals, and the Federal Reserve Bank of Richmond, one of 12 Federal Reserve Banks, as well as offices for international companies such as Genworth Financial, Capital One, Philip Morris USA, and numerous other banks and brokerages. Richmond is also home to three of the largest law firms in the United States: Hunton & Williams, McGuireWoods, and Williams Mullen. Another law firm with a major Richmond presence is Troutman Sanders, which merged with Richmond-based Mays & Valentine LLP in 2001.

Since the 1960s Richmond has been a prominent hub for advertising agencies and advertising related businesses. One of the most notable Richmond-based agencies is The Martin Agency, founded in 1965 and currently employing 500 people. As a result of local advertising agency support, VCU's graduate advertising school (VCU Brandcenter) is consistently ranked the No. 1 advertising graduate program in the country.

Richmond is home to the rapidly developing Virginia BioTechnology Research Park, which opened in 1995 as an incubator facility for biotechnology and pharmaceutical companies. The United Network for Organ Sharing, which maintains the nation's organ transplant waiting list, occupies one building in the park. Philip Morris USA opened a $350 million research and development facility in the park in 2007. Once fully developed, park officials expect the site to employ roughly 3,000 scientists, technicians and engineers.

Richmond's revitalized downtown includes the Canal Walk, a new Greater Richmond Convention Center, and expansion on both VCU campuses. A new performing arts center, Richmond CenterStage, opened on September 12, 2009. The complex included a renovation of the Carpenter Center and construction of a new multipurpose hall, community playhouse, and arts education center in parts of the old Thalhimers department store.

Craft beer, cider and liquor production is also growing in the River City, with twelve micro-breweries in city proper; the oldest is Legend Brewery, founded in 1994. Two cideries, Buskey Cider and Blue Bee Cider, are located in the popular beverage neighborhood of Scott's Addition, and are joined by nine breweries, one meadery, and one distillery. Three distilleries, Reservoir Distillery, Belle Isle Craft Spirits and James River Distillery, were established in 2010, 2013 and 2014, respectively.

Additionally, Richmond is gaining attention from the film and television industry, with several high-profile films shot in the metro region in the past few years, including the major motion picture Lincoln which led to Daniel Day-Lewis's third Oscar, Killing Kennedy with Rob Lowe, airing on the National Geographic Channel and Turn, starring Jamie Bell and airing on AMC. Richmond was the main filming location for the PBS drama series Mercy Street, which premiered in Winter 2016. Several organizations, including the Virginia Film Office and the Virginia Production Alliance, along with events like the Richmond International Film Festival and French Film Festival, continue to draw supporters of film and media to the region.

Fortune 500 companies and other large corporations

The Greater Richmond area was named the third-best city for business by MarketWatch in September 2007, ranking behind only the Minneapolis and Denver areas and just above Boston. The area is home to six Fortune 500 companies: electric utility Dominion Resources; CarMax; Owens & Minor; Genworth Financial, MeadWestvaco/ WestRock, and Altria Group. However, only Dominion Resources is headquartered within the city of Richmond; the others are located in the neighboring counties of Henrico and Hanover. In 2008, Altria moved its corporate HQ from New York City to Henrico County, adding another Fortune 500 corporation to Richmond's list. In February 2006, MeadWestvaco announced that they would move from Stamford, Connecticut, to Richmond in 2008 with the help of the Greater Richmond Partnership, a regional economic development organization that also helped locate Aditya Birla Minacs, Amazon.com, and Honeywell International, to the region. In July 2015, MeadWestvaco merged with Georgia-based Rock-Tenn Company creating WestRock Company.

Other Fortune 500 companies, while not headquartered in the area, do have a major presence. These include SunTrust Banks (based in Atlanta), Capital One (officially based in McLean, Virginia, but founded in Richmond with its operations center and most employees in the Richmond area), and medical and pharmaceutical giant McKesson Corporation (based in Las Colinas, Texas). Capital One and Philip Morris USA are two of the largest private Richmond-area employers. DuPont maintains a production facility in South Richmond known as the Spruance Plant. UPS Freight, the less-than-truckload division of United Parcel Service has its corporate headquarters in Richmond.

Other companies based in Richmond include engineering specialists CTI Consultants, chemical company NewMarket; Brink's, a security and armored car company; Estes Express Lines, a freight carrier, Universal Corporation, a tobacco merchant; Cavalier Telephone, now Windstream, a telephone, internet, and digital television provider formed in Richmond in 1998; Cherry Bekaert & Holland, a top 30 accounting firm serving the Southeast; the law firm of McGuireWoods; Elephant Insurance, an insurance company subsidiary of Admiral Group and Media General, a company specializing in broadcast media.

Poverty
As of 2016, 24.8% of Richmond residents live below the federal poverty line, the second-highest among the 30 largest cities and counties in Virginia. An Annie E. Casey Foundation report issued in 2016 also determined that Richmond had a child poverty rate of 39%, more than double the rate for Virginia as a whole. As of 2016, Richmond had the second-highest rate of eviction filings and judgments of any American city with a population of 100,000 or more (in states where complete data was available). Some Richmond neighborhoods, such as the Creighton Court public-housing complex, are particularly well known for concentrations of poverty.

Arts and culture

Museums and monuments

Several of the city's large general museums are located near the Boulevard. On Boulevard proper are the Virginia Historical Society and the Virginia Museum of Fine Arts, lending their name to what is sometimes called the Museum District. Nearby on Broad Street is the Science Museum of Virginia, housed in the neoclassical former 1919 Broad Street Union Station. Immediately adjacent is the Children's Museum of Richmond, and two blocks away, the Virginia Center for Architecture. Within the downtown are the Library of Virginia and the Valentine Richmond History Center. Elsewhere are the Virginia Holocaust Museum and the Old Dominion Railway Museum.

Richmond is home to museums and battlefields of the American Civil War. Near the riverfront is the Richmond National Battlefield Park Visitors Center and the American Civil War Center at Historic Tredegar, both housed in the former buildings of the Tredegar Iron Works, where much of the  ordnance for the war was produced. In Court End, near the Virginia State Capitol, is the Museum of the Confederacy, along with the Davis Mansion, also known as the White House of the Confederacy; both feature a wide variety of objects and material from the era. The temporary home of General Robert E. Lee still stands on Franklin Street in downtown Richmond. The history of slavery and emancipation are also increasingly represented: there is a former slave trail along the river that leads to Ancarrow's Boat Ramp and Historic Site which has been developed with interpretive signage, and in 2007, the Reconciliation Statue was placed in Shockoe Bottom, with parallel statues placed in Liverpool and Benin representing points of the Triangle Trade.

Other historical points of interest include St. John's Church, the site of Patrick Henry's famous "Give me liberty or give me death" speech, and the Edgar Allan Poe Museum, features many of his writings and other artifacts of his life, particularly when he lived in the city as a child, a student, and a successful writer. The John Marshall House, the home of the former Chief Justice of the United States, is also located downtown and features many of his writings and objects from his life. Hollywood Cemetery is the burial grounds of two U.S. Presidents as well as many Civil War officers and soldiers. Beth Ahabah Museum and Archives collects, preserves and exhibits materials that focus on Jewish history and culture specifically connected to Richmond, VA.

The city was home to many monuments and memorials, most notably those along Monument Avenue. Many of the monuments on Monument Avenue were removed after the Floyd (George) riots of 2020. On June 9, 2020, protesters tore down the Columbus monument and threw it in Fountain Lake. Located near Byrd Park is the famous World War I Memorial Carillon, a 56-bell carillon tower. Dedicated in 1956, the Virginia War Memorial is located on Belvedere overlooking the river, and is a monument to Virginians who died in battle in World War II, the Korean War, the Vietnam War, the Gulf War, the War in Afghanistan, and the Iraq War. One other very important monument which was left standing is the Bill "Bojangles" Robinson monument in Jackson Ward. On December 12, 2022 the General A. P. Hill's monument and remains were removed by authorities, being the last of the Confederate general's statues in the city.

Agecroft Hall is a Tudor manor house and estate located on the James River in the Windsor Farms neighborhood of Richmond. The manor house was built in the late 15th century, and was originally located in the Agecroft area of Pendlebury, in the historic county of Lancashire in England.

Visual and performing arts
Musicians of note associated with Richmond include Jason Mraz, Jimmy Dean, Agents of Good Roots, Aimee Mann, Alabama Thunderpussy, Avail, Broadside, Carbon Leaf, Cracker, D'Angelo, Denali, Down to Nothing, Engine Down, Four Walls Falling, Iron Reagan, Lamb of God, Lil Ugly Mane, Lucy Dacus, Municipal Waste, Nickelus F, River City High, Sparklehorse, Strike Anywhere, Chris Brown, Eric Stanley, and Fighting Gravity. Richmond is also home of GWAR, a heavy metal art collective based in a Scott's Addition warehouse.

Murals
With the advent of the Richmond Mural Project (RMP) by RVA Mag and Art Whino; as well as the RVA Street Art Festival in 2013, the city quickly gained more than 100 murals from international mural artists such as Aryz, Roa, Ron English, and Natalia Rak. While the RMP focused on international talent, the RVA Street Art festival helmed by long-time local mural artist Ed Trask focused largely on regional artists (although it also brought in PoseMSK, Jeff Soto, and Mark Jenkins.) After some criticism the RMP included its first local artist, Nils Westergard, who was already on the international circuit; following the next year with Jacob Eveland. The two festivals are unrelated, with the RMP being defunct, and the RVA Street Art festival happening sporadically due to funding issues. With the advent of the Summer of Floyd riots across America, local artist Hamilton Glass spearheaded the Mending Walls Project featuring walls by pairs of local artists. Many of the murals are unrelated to any project, and are done under the impetus of the artists alone.

Professional performing companies
From earliest days, Virginia, and Richmond in particular, have welcomed live theatrical performances. From Lewis Hallam's early productions of Shakespeare in Williamsburg, the focus shifted to Richmond's antebellum prominence as a main colonial and early 19th century performance venue for such celebrated American and English actors as William Macready, Edwin Forrest, and the Booth family. In the 20th century, Richmonders' love of theater continued with many amateur troupes and regular touring professional productions. In the 1960s a small renaissance or golden age accompanied the growth of professional dinner theaters and the fostering of theater by the Virginia Museum, reaching a peak in the 1970s with the establishment of a resident Equity company at the Virginia Museum Theater (now the Leslie Cheek) and the birth of Theatre IV, a company that continues to this day under the name Virginia Repertory Theatre.
Virginia Repertory Theatre is Central Virginia's largest professional theatre organization. It was created in 2012 when Barksdale Theatre and Theatre IV, which had shared one staff for over a decade, merged to become one company. With an annual budget of over $5 million, the theatre employs over 240 artists each year, presenting a season at the November Theatre and Theatre Gym at Virginia Rep Center, as well as productions at the Hanover Tavern and The Children's Theatre in The Shops at Willow Lawn. The historic November Theatre opened in 1911 as the Empire Theatre, offering stock and vaudeville performances. In 1915 it changed its name from the Empire to the Strand and continued under that name until damaged by fire in 1927. It reopened in 1933 as the "Booker T," and served as the leading black movie house for many years when Richmond was segregated. It closed in 1974 and was idle until real estate developer Mitchell Kambis rescued and renovated it. Kambis restored the Empire name and in 1979 leased it to Keith Fowler, artistic director of the American Revels Company. Revels restored live professional theater to downtown Richmond. Revels was succeeded by Theatre IV in 1984. On its 100th anniversary in 2011 the theatre was further restored when Sara Belle and Neil November made a $2 million gift to Theatre IV and Barksdale.[1] The November now serves as Virginia Rep's headquarters and home and anchors the Arts District. It is currently under the leadership of Artistic Director Bruce Miller and Managing Director Phil Whiteway.
Richmond Ballet, founded in 1957.
Richmond Triangle Players, founded in 1993, delivers theater programs exploring themes of equality, identity, affection and family across sexual orientation and gender spectrums.
Richmond Symphony
Virginia Opera, the Official Opera Company of the Commonwealth of Virginia, founded in 1974. Presents eight mainstage performances every year at the Carpenter Theater.

Other venues and companies

Other venues and companies include:
The Altria Theater, the city-owned opera house.
The Leslie Cheek Theater, after lying dormant for eight years, re-opened in 2011 in the heart of the Virginia Museum of Fine Arts at 200 N. Boulevard. The elegant 500-seat proscenium stage was constructed in 1955 to match then museum director Leslie Cheek's vision of a theater worthy of a fine arts institution. Operating for years as the Virginia Museum Theater (VMT), it supported an amateur community theater under the direction of Robert Telford. When Cheek retired, he advised trustees on the 1969 appointment of Keith Fowler as head of the theater arts division and artistic director of VMT. Fowler led the theater to become the city's first resident Actors Equity\LORT theater, adding major foreign authors and the premieres of new American works to the repertory. Under his leadership VMT reached a "golden age," gaining international recognition and more than doubling its subscription base. Successive artistic administrations changed the name of the theater to "TheatreVirginia".  Deficits caused TheatreVirginia to close its doors in 2002. Now, renovated and renamed for its founder, the Leslie Cheek is restoring live performance to VMFA and, while no longer supporting a resident company, it is available for special theatrical and performance events.
The National Theater is Richmond's premier music venue. It holds 1500 people and has shows regularly throughout the week. It opened winter of 2007 and was built in 1923. It features a state-of-the-art V-DOSC sound system, only the sixth installed in the country and only the third installed on the East Coast.
Visual Arts Center of Richmond, a not-for-profit organization that is one of the largest nongovernmental arts learning centers in the state of Virginia, founded in 1963. Serves 28,000 individuals annually.
Richmond CenterStage, a performing arts center that opened in Downtown Richmond in 2009 as part of an expansion of earlier facilities. The complex includes a renovation of the 1,700-seat Carpenter Theater and construction of a new multipurpose hall, community playhouse, and arts education center in the location of the old Thalhimers department store.
The Byrd Theatre in Carytown, a movie palace from the 1920s that features second-run movies, as well as the French Film Festival.
Virginia Commonwealth University School of the Arts, consistently ranked as one of the best in the nation.
Dogwood Dell, an amphitheatre in Byrd Park, where the Richmond Department of Recreation and Parks presents an annual Festival of the Arts.
School of the Performing Arts in the Richmond Community (School of the Performing Arts in the Richmond Community). SPARC was founded in 1981, and trained children to become "triple threats", meaning they were equally versed in singing, acting, and dancing. SPARC has become the largest community-based theater arts education program in Virginia and it offers classes to every age group, during the summer and throughout the year.
Classic Amphitheatre at Strawberry Hill, the former summer concert venue located at Richmond International Raceway.

Commercial art galleries include Metro Space Gallery and Gallery 5 in a newly designated arts district.
Not-for-profit galleries include Visual Arts Center of Richmond, 1708 Gallery and Artspace.

In addition, in 2008, a new  Gay Community Center opened on the city's north side, which hosts meetings of many kinds, and includes a large art gallery space.

Literary arts
Richmond has long been a hub for literature and writers. Edgar Allan Poe was a child in the city, and the town's oldest stone house is now a museum to his life and works. The Southern Literary Messenger, which included his writing, is just one of many notable publications that began in Richmond. Other noteworthy authors who have called Richmond home include Pulitzer-winning Ellen Glasgow, controversial figure James Branch Cabell, Meg Medina, Dean King, David L. Robbins, and MacArthur Fellow Paule Marshall. Tom Wolfe was born in Richmond, as was Breaking Bad creator Vince Gilligan. David Baldacci graduated from Virginia Commonwealth University, where the creative writing faculty has included Marshall, Claudia Emerson, Kathleen Graber, T. R. Hummer, Dave Smith, David Wojahn, and Susann Cokal. Notable graduates include Sheri Reynolds, Jon Pineda, Anna Journey and Joshua Poteat. A community-based organization, James River Writers, serves the Greater Richmond Region, It sponsors many programs for writers at all stages of their careers and puts on an annual writers' conference that draws attendees from miles away.

Architecture

Richmond is home to many significant structures, including some designed by notable architects. The city contains diverse styles, including significant examples of Georgian, Federal, Greek Revival, Neoclassical, Egyptian Revival, Romanesque Revival, Gothic Revival, Tudor Revival, Italianate, Queen Anne, Colonial Revival, Art Deco, Modernist, International, and Postmodern buildings.

Much of Richmond's early architecture was destroyed by the Evacuation Fire in 1865. It is estimated that 25% of all buildings in Richmond were destroyed during this fire. Even fewer now remain due to construction and demolition that has taken place since Reconstruction. In spite of this, Richmond contains many historically significant buildings and districts. Buildings remain from Richmond's colonial period, such as the Patteson-Schutte House and the Edgar Allan Poe Museum (Richmond, Virginia), both built before 1750.

Architectural classicism is heavily represented in all districts of the city, particularly in Downtown, the Fan, and the Museum District. Several notable classical architects have designed buildings in Richmond. The Virginia State Capitol was designed by Thomas Jefferson and Charles-Louis Clérisseau in 1785. It is the second-oldest US statehouse in continuous use (after Maryland's) and was the first US government building built in the neo-classical style of architecture, setting the trend for other state houses and the federal government buildings (including the White House and The Capitol) in Washington, D.C. Robert Mills designed Monumental Church on Broad Street. Adjoining it is the 1845 Egyptian Building, one of the few Egyptian Revival buildings in the United States.

The firm of John Russell Pope designed Broad Street Station as well as Branch House on Monument Avenue, designed as a private residence in the Tudor style, now serving as the Branch Museum of Architecture and Design. Broad Street Station (or Union Station), designed in the Beaux-Arts style, is no longer a functioning station but is now home to the Science Museum of Virginia. Main Street Station, designed by Wilson, Harris, and Richards, has been returned to use in its original purpose. The Jefferson Hotel and the Commonwealth Club were both designed by the classically trained Beaux-Arts architects Carrère and Hastings. Many buildings on the University of Richmond campus, including Jeter Hall and Ryland Hall, were designed by Ralph Adams Cram, most famous for his Princeton University Chapel and the Cathedral of Saint John the Divine.

Richmond's urban residential neighborhoods also hold particular significance to the city's fabric. The Fan, the Museum District, Jackson Ward, Carver, Carytown, Oregon Hill and Church Hill (among others) are largely single use town homes and mixed use or full retail/dining establishments. These districts are anchored by large streets such as Franklin Street, Cary Street, the Boulevard, and Monument Avenue. The city's growth in population over the last decade has been concentrated in these areas.

Among Richmond's most interesting architectural features is its cast-iron architecture. Second only to New Orleans in its concentration of cast-iron work, the city is home to a unique collection of cast iron porches, balconies, fences, and finials. Richmond's position as a center of iron production helped to fuel its popularity within the city. At the height of production in the 1890, 25 foundries operated in the city employing nearly 3,500 metal workers. This number is seven times the number of general construction workers being employed in Richmond at the time which illustrates the importance of its iron exports. Porches and fences in urban neighborhoods such as Jackson Ward, Church Hill, and Monroe Ward are particularly elaborate, often featuring ornate iron casts never replicated outside of Richmond. In some cases cast were made for a single residential or commercial application.

Richmond is home to several notable instances of various styles of modernism. Minoru Yamasaki designed the Federal Reserve Building which dominates the downtown skyline. The architectural firm of Skidmore, Owings & Merrill has designed two buildings: the Library of Virginia and the General Assembly Offices at the Eighth and Main Building. Philip Johnson designed the WRVA Building. The Richard Neutra-designed Rice House, a residence on a private island on the James River, remains Richmond's only true International Style home. The W.G. Harris residence in Richmond was designed by famed early modern architect and member of the Harvard Five, Landis Gores. The VCU Institute for Contemporary Art, designed by Steven Holl, opened in 2018. Other notable architects to have worked in the city include Rick Mather, I.M. Pei, and Gordon Bunshaft.

Many of Richmond's historic properties were documented in books and 1970s era black and white photographs by John G. Zehmer, an architectural historian and preservationist.

Richmond has been described by former mayor Dwight C. Jones as the tacky light capital of the world.

Historic districts

Richmond's City Code provides for the creation of old and historic districts so as to "recognize and protect the historic, architectural, cultural, and artistic heritage of the City". Pursuant to that authority, the city has designated 45 districts throughout the city. The majority of these districts are also listed in the Virginia Landmarks Register ("VLR") and the National Register of Historic Places ("NRHP").

Fifteen of the districts represent broad sections of the city:

The remaining thirty districts are limited to an individual building or group of buildings throughout the city:

Food
Richmond has been recognized in recent years for being a "foodie city", particularly for its modern renditions of traditional Southern cuisine. The city also claims the invention of the sailor sandwich, which includes pastrami, knockwurst, Swiss cheese and mustard on rye bread. Richmond is also where, in 1935, canned beer was made commercially available for the first time.

Sports

Richmond is not home to any major league professional sports teams, but since 2013, the Washington Commanders of the National Football League have held their summer training camp in the city. There are also several minor league sports in the city, including the Richmond Kickers of USL League One and the Richmond Flying Squirrels of the Class AA Double-A Northeast of Minor League Baseball (an affiliate of the San Francisco Giants). The Kickers began playing in Richmond in 1993, and currently play at City Stadium. In 2018 the Richmond Kickers left the USL to become founders in Division 3 Soccer. The Squirrels opened their first season at The Diamond on April 15, 2010. From 1966 through 2008, the city was home to the Richmond Braves, a AAA affiliate of the Atlanta Braves of Major League Baseball, until the franchise relocated to Georgia.

It is also the home to the Richmond Black Widows, the city's first women's football team, founded in 2015 by Sarah Schkeeper. They are a part of the Women's Football Alliance. Their game season begins in April, with preseason beginning in January.

Another significant sports venue is the 6,000-seat Arthur Ashe Athletic Center, a multi-purpose arena named for tennis great and Richmond resident Arthur Ashe. This facility hosts a variety of local sporting events, concerts, and other activities. As the home of Arthur Ashe, the sport of tennis is also popular in Richmond, and in 2010, the United States Tennis Association named Richmond as the third "Best Tennis Town", behind Charleston, South Carolina, and Atlanta, Georgia.

Auto racing is also popular in the area. The Richmond Raceway (RR) has hosted NASCAR Cup Series races since 1953, as well as the Capital City 400 from 1962 − 1980. RIR also hosted IndyCar's SunTrust Indy Challenge from 2001 − 2009. Another track, Southside Speedway, has operated since 1959 and sits just southwest of Richmond in Chesterfield County. This  oval short-track has become known as the "Toughest Track in the South" and "The Action Track", and features weekly stock car racing on Friday nights. Southside Speedway has acted as the breeding grounds for many past NASCAR legends including Richard Petty, Bobby Allison and Darrell Waltrip, and claims to be the home track of NASCAR superstar Denny Hamlin.

In 2015, Richmond hosted the 2015 UCI Road World Championships, which had cyclists from 76 countries and an economic impact on the Greater Richmond Region estimated to be $158.1 million, from both event staging and visitor spending. The course used for the championships was the first real-world location to be recreated within the indoor cycle training application, Zwift, and has been subsequently joined within the game by the UCI world championships courses from 2018 (Innsbruck) and 2019 (Harrogate).

College basketball has also had recent success with the Richmond Spiders and the VCU Rams, both of the Atlantic 10 Conference. The Spiders' men's and women's teams play at Robins Center and the Rams' men's and women's teams play at the Stuart C. Siegel Center.

Parks and recreation

The city operates one of the oldest municipal park systems in the country. The park system began when the city council voted in 1851 to acquire , now known as Monroe Park.

Several parks are located along the James River, and the James River Parks System offers bike trails, hiking and nature trails, and many scenic overlooks along the river's route through the city. The trails are used as part of the Xterra East Championship course for both the running and mountain biking portions of the off-road triathlon.

There are also parks on two major islands in the river: Belle Isle and Brown's Island. Belle Isle, at various former times a Powhatan fishing village, colonial-era horse race track, and Civil War prison camp, is the larger of the two, and contains many bike trails as well as a small cliff that is used for rock climbing instruction. One can walk the island and still see many of the remains of the Civil War prison camp, such as an arms storage room and a gun emplacement that was used to quell prisoner riots. Brown's Island is a smaller island and a popular venue of a large number of free outdoor concerts and festivals in the spring and summer, such as the weekly Friday Cheers concert series or the James River Beer and Seafood Festival.

Two other major parks in the city along the river are Byrd Park and Maymont, located near the Fan District. Byrd Park features a  running track, with exercise stops, a public dog park, and a number of small lakes for small boats, as well as two monuments, Buddha house, and an amphitheater. Prominently featured in the park is the World War I Memorial Carillon, built in 1926 as a memorial to those that died in the war. Maymont, located adjacent to Byrd Park, is a  Victorian estate with a museum, formal gardens, native wildlife exhibits, nature center, carriage collection, and children's farm. Other parks in the city include Joseph Bryan Park Azalea Garden, Forest Hill Park (former site of the Forest Hill Amusement Park), Chimborazo Park (site of the National Battlefield Headquarters), among others.

The James River itself through Richmond is renowned as one of the best in the country for urban white-water rafting/canoeing/kayaking. Several rafting companies offer complete services. There are also several easily accessed riverside areas within the city limits for rock-hopping, swimming, and picnicking.

Lewis Ginter Botanical Garden is located adjacent to the city in Henrico County. The Garden is a public place for the display and scientific study of plants. Lewis Ginter Botanical Garden is one of only two independent public botanical gardens in Virginia and is designated a state botanical garden.

Several theme parks are also located near the city, including Kings Dominion to the north, and Busch Gardens to the east, near Williamsburg.

Government

Richmond city government consists of a city council with representatives from nine districts serving in a legislative and oversight capacity, as well as a popularly elected, at-large mayor serving as head of the executive branch. Citizens in each of the nine districts elect one council representative each to serve a four-year term. Beginning with the November 2008 election Council terms was lengthened to 4 years. The city council elects from among its members one member to serve as Council President and one to serve as Council Vice President. The city council meets at City Hall, located at 900 E. Broad St., 2nd Floor, on the second and fourth Mondays of every month, except August.

In 1977, a federal district court ruled in favor of Curtis Holt Jr. who had claimed the council's existing election process — an at large voting system — was racially biased. The verdict required the city to rebuild its council into nine distinct wards. Within the year the city council switched from majority white to majority black, reflecting the city's populace. This new city council elected Richmond's first black mayor, Henry L. Marsh.

Richmond's government changed in 2004 from a council-manager form of government with a mayor elected by and from the council to an at-large, popularly elected mayor. Unlike most major cities, in order to be elected, a mayoral candidate must win a plurality of the vote in five of the city's nine council districts. If no one crosses that threshold, a runoff is held between the two top finishers in the first round. This was implemented as a compromise in order to address concerns that better-organized and wealthier white voters could have undue influence.  In a landslide election, incumbent mayor Rudy McCollum was defeated by L. Douglas Wilder, who previously served Virginia as the first elected African American governor in the United States since Reconstruction. The current mayor of Richmond is Levar Stoney who was elected in 2016. The mayor is not a part of the Richmond City Council.

, the Richmond City Council consisted of:
Andreas D. Addison, 1st District (West End)
Katherine Jordan, 2nd District (North Central)
Ann-Frances Lambert, 3rd District (Northside)
Kristen Nye, 4th District (Southwest)
Stephanie A. Lynch, 5th District (Central)
Ellen F. Robertson, 6th District (Gateway), Council Vice President
Cynthia I. Newbille, 7th District (East End), Council President
Reva M. Trammell, 8th District (Southside)
Michael J. Jones, 9th District (South Central)

Education

Public schools

The city of Richmond operates 28 elementary schools, nine middle schools, and eight high schools, serving a total student population of 24,000 students. There is one Governor's School in the city − the Maggie L. Walker Governor's School for Government and International Studies. In 2008, it was named as one of Newsweek magazine's 18 "public elite" high schools, and in 2012, it was rated #16 of America's best high schools overall. Richmond's public school district also runs one of Virginia's four public charter schools, the Patrick Henry School of Science and Arts, which was founded in 2010. The class of 2020 saw an on-time graduation rate of 71.6% putting it at least 20 percentage points behind most other school divisions and making it the worst in the state.

Private schools
As of 2008, there were 36 private schools serving grades one or higher in the city of Richmond. Some of these schools include: Banner Christian School, Benedictine College Preparatory, St. Bridget School, Brook Road Academy, Collegiate School, Grace Christian School, Grove Christian School, Guardian Christian Academy, St. Christopher's School, St. Gertrude High School, St. Catherine's School, Southside Baptist Christian School, Northstar Academy, The Steward School, Trinity Episcopal School, The New Community School, and Veritas School.

Colleges and universities

The Richmond area has many major institutions of higher education, including Virginia Commonwealth University (public), University of Richmond (private), Virginia Union University (private), South University–Richmond (private, for-profit), Union Theological Seminary & Presbyterian School of Christian Education (private), and the Baptist Theological Seminary in Richmond (BTSR—private). Several community colleges are found in the metro area, including J. Sargeant Reynolds Community College and Brightpoint Community College (Chesterfield County). In addition, there are several Technical Colleges in Richmond including ITT Technical Institute, ECPI College of Technology and Centura College. There are several vocational colleges also, such as Fortis College and Bryant Stratton College.

Media

The Richmond Times-Dispatch, the local daily newspaper in Richmond with a Sunday circulation of 120,000, is owned by Lee Enterprises, Inc.  Style Weekly, an online alternative local publication covering popular culture, arts, and entertainment, is owned by VPM Media Corporation. RVA Magazine is the city's only independent art music and culture publication, was once monthly, but is now issued quarterly. The Richmond Free Press and the Voice cover the news from an African-American perspective.

The Richmond metro area is served by many local television and radio stations. , the Richmond-Petersburg designated market area (DMA) is the 58th largest in the U.S. with 553,950 homes according to Nielsen Market Research. The major network television affiliates are WTVR-TV 6 (CBS), WRIC-TV 8 (ABC), WWBT 12 (NBC), WRLH-TV 35 (Fox), and WUPV 65 (CW). PBS stations include WCVE-TV 23 and WCVW 57. There are also a wide variety of radio stations in the Richmond area, catering to many different interests, including news, talk radio, and sports, as well as an eclectic mix of musical interests.  Richmond enjoys a low power FM Station, WRIR, which features all volunteer community supported radio at all hours.

Infrastructure

Transportation

Richmond International is now served by ten passenger and four cargo airlines with over 200 daily flights providing non-stop service to major destination markets and connecting flights to destinations worldwide. A record 3.3 million passengers used Richmond International Airport in 2006, a 13% increase over 2005.

Richmond is a major hub for intercity bus company Greyhound Lines, with its terminal at 2910 N Boulevard. Multiple runs per day connect directly with Washington, D.C., New York, Raleigh, and elsewhere. Direct trips to New York take approximately 7.5 hours. Discount carrier Megabus also provides curbside service from outside of Main Street Station. Direct service is available to Washington, D.C., Hampton Roads, Charlotte, Raleigh, Baltimore, and Philadelphia. Most other connections to Megabus served cities, such as New York, can be made from Washington, D.C.

Local transit and paratransit bus service in Richmond, Henrico, and Chesterfield counties is provided by the Greater Richmond Transit Company (GRTC). The GRTC, however, serves only small parts of the suburban counties. The far West End (Innsbrook and Short Pump) and almost all of Chesterfield County have no public transportation despite dense housing, retail, and office development. According to a 2008 GRTC operations analysis report, a majority of GRTC riders utilize their services because they do not have an available alternative such as a private vehicle. Richmond, and the surrounding metropolitan area, was granted a roughly $25 million grant from the U.S. Department of Transportation in 2014 to support the GRTC Pulse bus rapid transit system, which opened in June 2018, running along Broad Street from Willow Lawn to  Landing, in the first phase of an improved public transportation hub for the region.

The Richmond area also has two railroad stations served by Amtrak. Each station receives regular service from north of Richmond including Washington, D.C., Philadelphia, and New York. The region's main station, Staples Mill Road Station, is located just outside the city on a major north–south freight line and receives all service to and from all points south including Raleigh, Durham, Charlotte, Savannah, Newport News, Norfolk and Florida. Richmond's only railway station located within the city limits, the historic Main Street Station, was renovated in 2004. As of 2010, the station only receives trains headed to and from Newport News due to track layout.

Richmond also benefits from an excellent position in reference to the state's transportation network, lying at the junction of east–west Interstate 64 and north–south Interstate 95, two of the most heavily traveled highways in the state, as well as along several major rail lines.

Major highways

 (Beltline Expy)

 (Brook Rd, Azelea Ave, Chamberlayne Ave, Belvedere St, Cowardin Ave, Jefferson Davis Hwy)
 (Staples Mill Rd, Broad St)

 (Broad Street)
 (Chamberlayne Ave, Belvedere St, Cowardin Ave, Jefferson Davis Hwy)
 (Hull St Rd; Hull St; N 14th St; joins US 60 Main St;  WB 17th St [Oliver Hill Way], EB W 18th St; Mechanicsville Tnpk)
 (E Main St; N 25th St)
 (Kensington Ave, Patterson Ave)
 (Broad Rock Blvd)

 (Connector to VA-195)
 (Cary St [EB after I-195], W Main St [WB after I-195], Cary St Rd, River Rd, Huguenot Rd [S of the James River])

 (Hermitage Rd, The Boulevard, Park Dr, Blanton Ave, Westover Hills Blvd, Belt Blvd, Bells Rd)
 (toll route) (Downtown Expy)
 (Malvern Ave, Westwood Ave, Saunders Ave, W Laburnum Ave)
 (Entrance to the Grounds of the Virginia Commonwealth University)

Utilities
Electricity in the Richmond Metro area is provided by Dominion Energy. The company, based in Richmond, is one of the nation's largest producers of energy, serving retail energy customers in nine states. Electricity is provided in the Richmond area primarily by the North Anna Nuclear Generating Station and Surry Nuclear Generating Station, as well as a coal-fired station in Chester, Virginia. These three plants provide a total of 4,453 megawatts of power. Several other natural gas plants provide extra power during times of peak demand. These include facilities in Chester, and Surry, and two plants in Richmond (Gravel Neck and Darbytown).

Natural gas in the Richmond Metro area is provided by the city's Department of Public Utilities and also serves portions of Henrico and Chesterfield counties.

Water is provided by the city's Department of Public Utilities, and is one of the largest water producers in Virginia, with a modern plant that can treat up to 132 million gallons of water a day from the James River. The facility also provides water to the surrounding area through wholesale contracts with Henrico, Chesterfield, and Hanover counties. Overall, this results in a facility that provides water for approximately 500,000 people.

The wastewater treatment plant and distribution system of water mains, pumping stations and storage facilities provide water to approximately 62,000 customers in the city. There is also a wastewater treatment plant located on the south bank of the James River. This plant can treat up to 70 million gallons of water per day of sanitary sewage and stormwater before returning it to the river. The wastewater utility also operates and maintains  of sanitary sewer and pumping stations,  of intercepting sewer lines, and the Shockoe Retention Basin, a 44-million-gallon stormwater reservoir used during heavy rains.

Sister cities
Richmond's sister cities are:
 Richmond upon Thames, United Kingdom
 Saitama, Japan
 Ségou, Mali
 Windhoek, Namibia
 Zhengzhou, China

See also

Culture of Virginia
Richmond Police Department
 USS Richmond, 3 ships
:Category:People from Richmond, Virginia

Notes

References

Further reading
Ash, Stephen V. Rebel Richmond: Life and Death in the Confederate Capital (UNC Press, 2019).
Bill, Alfred Hoyt. The Beleaguered City: Richmond, 1861–1865 (1946).
Calcutt, Rebecca Barbour. Richmond's Wartime Hospitals (Pelican Publishing, 2005).
Chesson, Michael B. Richmond after the war, 1865–1890 (Virginia State Library, 1981).

Furgurson, Ernest B. Ashes of glory: Richmond at war (1996).
Hoffman, Steven J. Race, Class and Power in the Building of Richmond, 1870-1920 (McFarland, 2004).
Mustian, Thomas F. Facts and Legends of Richmond Area Streets. (Richmond, VA: Dementi Milestone Publishing, 2007).
Thomas, Emory M. The Confederate State of Richmond: A Biography of the Capital (LSU Press, 1998).
Trammell, Jack. The Richmond Slave Trade: The Economic Backbone of the Old Dominion (The History Press, 2012).
Wright, Mike. City Under Siege: Richmond in the Civil War (Rowman & Littlefield, 1995)

External links

ChamberRVA, the regional chamber of commerce for Greater Richmond
Richmond Metropolitan Convention & Visitors Bureau
Richmond, Virginia, a National Park Service Discover Our Shared Heritage travel itinerary

 
Cities in Virginia
Greater Richmond Region
Populated places on the James River (Virginia)
Populated places established in 1737
1737 establishments in the Thirteen Colonies
Capitals of former nations
Majority-minority counties and independent cities in Virginia